Willy Schäfer (6 March 1933 – 6 May 2011) was a German television actor. Schäfer is best known as Willi Berger on the television series Derrick, a role he played in more than 190 of the series' 281 episodes. He was born in Saarbrücken, Territory of the Saar Basin, and died in Munich, Germany. Willy Schäfer was married and lived in Munich, where he had settled since 1960 and became a permanent resident because of his role in Derrick. He is survived by a son.

Filmography

External links

References 

1933 births
2011 deaths
German male television actors
German male film actors
People from Saarbrücken